Zhang Lingfu (August 20, 1903 – May 16, 1947) was a high-ranking general of the Chinese National Revolutionary Army. He successfully fought against the Communists and the Imperial Japanese Army. In 1947, his unit was surrounded by Chinese communist forces commanded by Field Marshal Chen Yi and General Su Yu. Zhang was unable to breakout from the communist encirclement because the relief efforts headed by his nationalist colleagues did not arrive in time, and he was killed in action in the Menglianggu Campaign on May 16, 1947.

Early years
Zhang was born with the given name of Zhonglin (鐘麟) in a rural gentry family outside of Xi'an, the capital of Shaanxi province. He was a gifted calligrapher during his middle school days and was praised by his schoolmaster Yu Youren, a famous calligrapher and educator of the time. In 1924, he was admitted to Peking University as a history major. In 1924 he abandoned his studies and traveled with other young students to the south, joining the Whampoa Military Academy, some of his notable classmates included Du Yuming, Fan Hanjie, Li Mi, Qiu Qingquan, Hu Lien, Liu Yuzhang, Guan Linzheng and Lin Biao. As a member of the fourth graduating class of the academy, he joined the first corps of the National Revolutionary Army, Chiang Kai-shek served as the corps commander as well as commander-in-chief of the North Expedition. After the KMT-CCP split occurred, he stayed with the Chinese Nationalist Party and served at platoon, battalion, and regiment levels during the Anti-Communist Encirclement Campaigns against the Jiangxi Soviet under nationalist general Hu Zongnan. In 1936, he suspected his wife of having affairs, so he shot her dead in his home. Generalissimo Chiang Kai-shek sentenced him to ten years in prison.

Second Sino-Japanese War
After serving in the prison for less than a year, the Second Sino-Japanese War broke out, his senior classmate Wang Yaowu successfully bailed him out of prison and appointed him as a regiment commander, Zhang participated the brutal street fighting in the Battle of Shanghai and Battle of Nanjing. In 1938 he was promoted to brigade commander, during the Battle of Wanjialing of the Wuhan theatre, he personally led a detachment that cut off the Japanese retreat route and ensured the final Chinese victory. In 1939 he was wounded in his left leg during the Battle of Nanchang. Although his doctor told after one more month of treatment his wounds could be healed, he returned to the army and participated in the Battle of Changsha. As a result, he was unable to recover from his injuries and his colleagues nicknamed him The lame legged general. Afterward, he was promoted to assistant division commander of the 51st division and deputy commander of 74th corps. In 1943, Zhang personally led a task force which relieved the besieged Chinese defenders in the ferocious Battle of Changde and forced the Imperial Japanese Army to retreat, and Chiang Kai-shek called him the model soldier. Although he failed to save General Fang Xianjue from the Japanese attacks during the Defense of Hengyang in 1944, his unit fought well and he tried his best, so the National War Council did not take any action against him. After this rather unhappy episode in his military career, his old superior officer Wang Yaowu helped him again by sending Zhang to the Army War College to study, and Zhang graduated with top grades. In the May 1945, he fought under Wang Yaowu in the Battle of West Hunan and was decorated with Order of Precious Tripod and Medal of Freedom, and He Yingqin promoted him as commander of 74th corps.

Chinese Civil War

Soon after the Second Sino-Japanese War is concluded, the resumption of the Chinese Civil War occurred throughout most of the country. Chiang Kai-shek reorganized his American trained and equipped divisions into five elite units: Sun Li-jen's New First Army, Liao Yaoxiang's New 6th Army, Qiu Qingquan's Fifth Army, Hu Lien's 18th Army and Zhang's 74th corps. Like many of his own nationalist classmates, Zhang joined the early successful nationalist advance against the communist controlled areas, and scored a smashing victory in the Battle of Huaiyin–Huai'an in the August 1946 against the communists. In early 1947, Chiang shifted his strategy and launched attacks on Yenan and Shandong under nationalist general Hu Zongnan and commander-in-chief of the nationalist army general Gu Zhutong, Zhang's 74th division speared nationalist advance into Shandong province. Communist commanders Chen Yi and Su Yu avoid to battle the nationalists because they tightly concentrated their formation together, which rendered the communist guerrilla tactics useless. Tang Enbo ordered Zhang Lingfu's 74th independent enhanced division to advance further than their original goal, as a result he was trapped by 5 columns of communist troops, on May 12, 1947, Chiang ordered Huang Baitao's 25th corps, Li Tianxia's 83rd corps, Hu Lien's 11th independent enhanced division, Qiu Qingquan's 5th corps to save Zhang Lingfu from the communist encirclement. But Li Tianxia only sent a token force to help his beleaguered colleague because of jealousy, Huang Baitao did try his best but his relief efforts were beaten back despite being supported by tanks and air cover, Qiu Qingquan and Hu Lien were too far away from the actual battlefield to be much of help. The difficult terrain in the mountainous areas also made Zhang unable to use his heavy weaponry; on the morning of May 16, 1947, Chiang issued another order on the pain of death to his commanders to save Zhang Lingfu and the 74th division, but none of the nationalist generals could make it in time. Zhang was killed in action in his cave hideout around 3:00 p.m. that same afternoon, although some sources cited that he committed suicide.

Aftermath
Chiang Kai-shek lost one of his most able generals in the Menglianggu Campaign and his elite 74th independent enhanced division was wiped out from nationalist order of battle. Although the unit was rebuilt later on, but it never regained the former strength of the old 74th independent enhanced division, and was again destroyed in the Huaihai Campaign next year. Because of this disastrous defeat, Chiang responded by relieving Gu Zhutong as commander-in-chief of the army, Tang Enbo lost his position as commander of the first army, Li Tianxia was court-martialled and would not be holding any command position for the next two years, while Huang Baitao received a serious reprimand but was allowed to stay on as commander of the 25th corps. Chiang Kai-shek personally arranged a state funeral for Zhang after recovering his remains from the Communist forces, and renamed the Mengyin County of Shandong province in his honor, and a naval destroyer was also named in his honor.

See also
Battle of Huaiyin–Huai'an
Menglianggu Campaign

References

https://generals.dk/general/Zhang_Lingfu/_/China.html
Ministry of National Defense R.O.C 
"Zhang Lingfu's widow applies for medal to be reissued; Ministry of Defence: Pay for it" (張靈甫遺孀申請補發勳章 國防部：花錢買) 
http://www.nownews.com/2009/11/09/11490-2530524.htm "In request for reissuing a medal, a martyred lieutenant general needs to pay? Lee Ching-hua: 'This makes us an international laughing stock.'" (要求補發勳章，殉國中將得繳錢？李慶華：國際大笑話)
http://www.nownews.com/2009/11/09/11490-2530710.htm  "Widow of lieutenant general requests reissuing of medal, yet has to pay to purchase? Ministry of Defence apologizes and promises special project to reissue medal." (中將遺孀盼補發勳章要花錢買？國防部致歉：馬上專案製發)
http://www.udn.com/2009/11/9/NEWS/NATIONAL/NAT5/5241096.shtml  "In incident requesting payment for reissuing of medal, Ministry of Defence holding involved personnel accountable." (補發勳章收錢 國防部究責)
Zhu, Zongzhen and Wang, Chaoguang, Liberation War History, 1st Edition, Social Scientific Literary Publishing House in Beijing, 2000,  (set)
Zhang, Ping, History of the Liberation War, 1st Edition, Chinese Youth Publishing House in Beijing, 1987,  (pbk.)
Jie, Lifu, Records of the Liberation War: The Decisive Battle of Two Kinds of Fates, 1st Edition, Hebei People's Publishing House in Shijiazhuang, 1990,  (set)
Literary and Historical Research Committee of the Anhui Committee of the Chinese People's Political Consultative Conference, Liberation War, 1st Edition, Anhui People's Publishing House in Hefei, 1987, 
Li, Zuomin, Heroic Division and Iron Horse: Records of the Liberation War, 1st Edition, Chinese Communist Party History Publishing House in Beijing, 2004, 
Wang, Xingsheng, and Zhang, Jingshan, Chinese Liberation War, 1st Edition, People's Liberation Army Literature and Art Publishing House in Beijing, 2001,  (set)
Huang, Youlan, History of the Chinese People's Liberation War, 1st Edition, Archives Publishing House in Beijing, 1992, 
Liu Wusheng, From Yan'an to Beijing: A Collection of Military Records and Research Publications of Important Campaigns in the Liberation War, 1st Edition, Central Literary Publishing House in Beijing, 1993, 
Tang, Yilu and Bi, Jianzhong, History of Chinese People's Liberation Army in Chinese Liberation War, 1st Edition, Military Scientific Publishing House in Beijing, 1993 – 1997,  (Volum 1), 7800219615 (Volum 2), 7800219631 (Volum 3), 7801370937 (Volum 4), and 7801370953 (Volum 5)

1903 births
1947 deaths
National Revolutionary Army generals from Shaanxi
Chinese people of World War II
Chinese anti-communists
Politicians from Xi'an
Whampoa Military Academy alumni
Recipients of the Order of the Sacred Tripod
National University of Peking alumni